Dowlatabad (also Romanized as Dowlatābād; also known as Dowlatābād-e ‘Azīzābād) is a village in Azizabad Rural District, in the Central District of Narmashir County, Kerman Province, Iran. At the 2006 census, its population was 542, in 139 families.

References 

Populated places in Narmashir County